Orlando Luz and Felipe Meligeni Alves were the defending champions but only Meligeni Alves chose to defend his title, partnering Marcelo Demoliner. Meligeni Alves lost in the quarterfinals to Luciano Darderi and Fernando Romboli.

Geoffrey Blancaneaux and Renzo Olivo won the title after defeating Diego Hidalgo and Cristian Rodríguez 6–4, 2–6, [10–6] in the final.

Seeds

Draw

References

External links
 Main draw

Iasi Open - Men's doubles